The 2018 New Mexico Lobos football team represented the University of New Mexico in the Mountain Division of the Mountain West Conference (MW) during 2018 NCAA Division I FBS football season. The team played its home games at Dreamstyle Stadium. In their seventh season under head coach Bob Davie, the team finished with a 3–9 record, 1–7 against MW opponents to finish last in the Mountain Division. They were outscored by a total of 434 to 319.

The team's statistical leaders included Sheriron Jones with 1,402 passing yards, Tyrone Owens with 687 rushing yards, and Andrew Shelley with 55 points scored.

Previous season
The Lobos finished the 2017 season 3–9 and 1–7 in Mountain West play to finish in last place in the Mountain Division and did not qualify for a bowl game.

Preseason

Award watch lists

Mountain West media days
During the Mountain West media days held July 24–25 at the Cosmopolitan on the Las Vegas Strip, the Lobos were predicted to finish in last place in the Mountain Division.

Media poll

Preseason All-Mountain West Team
The Lobos had one player selected to the preseason all-Mountain West team.

Offense

Aaron Jenkins – OL

Schedule

Source:

Roster

Game summaries

Incarnate Word

at Wisconsin

at New Mexico State

Liberty

at UNLV

at Colorado State

Fresno State

at Utah State

San Diego State

at Air Force

Boise State

Wyoming

References

New Mexico
New Mexico Lobos football seasons
New Mexico Lobos football